In April 2020, various weather forecast offices of the National Weather Service confirmed 267 tornadoes in the United States, indicating significantly above-average activity for the month. Based on the 1991–2010 averaging period, 155 tornadoes occur across the country during April. While the first three months of a year commonly feature tornadic activity across the Southeastern United States in close proximity to the Gulf of Mexico, this risk area expands to include the U.S. Midwest and U.S. Southern Great Plains in April, maximized in the states of Texas and Oklahoma. This expansion comes as powerful winter-like systems overlap with an increasingly warm and humid airmass from the Gulf of Mexico.

In 2020, several distinct severe weather events contributed to above-average activity. The first outbreak came from April 7–9, when 31 generally weak tornadoes were recorded across the Midwestern United States and Northeast, especially in Ohio. On Easter weekend, a widespread tornado outbreak featuring several significant to violent tornadoes occurred across much of the Southeast, with 141 tornado confirmations. Tornadoes inflicted 12 deaths in Mississippi, 3 deaths in Tennessee, 8 deaths in Georgia, and 9 deaths in South Carolina. The outbreak prompted 141 tornado warnings in a 24-hour period, the most in one day since the tornado outbreak of March 2–3, 2012. It registered as the sixth-largest tornado event on record in North Carolina, ranked as the second deadliest outbreak on record in South Carolina, and had the highest number of strong (EF2+) tornadoes in a single day on record in South Carolina. From April 21–23, another outbreak of 52 tornadoes across the Southeast caused six deaths. Total tornado activity in the United States caused 40 deaths in April 2020.

Tornado counts listed below are considered preliminary until final publication in the database of the National Centers for Environmental Information.

United States yearly total

April

April 7 event

April 8 event

April 9 event

April 12 event

April 13 event

April 15 event

April 17 event

April 19 event

April 20 event

April 21 event

April 22 event

April 23 event

April 24 event

April 25 event

April 28 event

April 29 event

See also
 Tornadoes of 2020
 2020 Easter tornado outbreak
 Tornado outbreak of April 22–23, 2020
 List of United States tornadoes from January to March 2020
 List of United States tornadoes from May to July 2020

Notes

References 

2020-related lists
Tornadoes of 2020
Tornadoes
2020 natural disasters in the United States
Tornadoes in the United States